

242001–242100 

|-bgcolor=#f2f2f2
| colspan=4 align=center | 
|}

242101–242200 

|-bgcolor=#f2f2f2
| colspan=4 align=center | 
|}

242201–242300 

|-bgcolor=#f2f2f2
| colspan=4 align=center | 
|}

242301–242400 

|-bgcolor=#f2f2f2
| colspan=4 align=center | 
|}

242401–242500 

|-id=479
| 242479 Marijampole ||  || Marijampole, with a population of 45 000, is the largest city in the Suvalkija region of south-west Lithuania. || 
|-id=492
| 242492 Fantomas ||  || Fantomas is one of the most popular characters in the history of French crime fiction. Fantomas was created in 1911 by Marcel Allain and Pierre Souvestre. || 
|}

242501–242600 

|-id=516
| 242516 Lindseystirling || 2005 AW || Lindsey Stirling (born 1986), an American violinist, dancer and composer || 
|-id=523
| 242523 Kreszgéza ||  || Géza Kresz (1846–1901), a Hungarian physician || 
|-id=529
| 242529 Hilaomar ||  || Hila Omar, a Moroccan amateur astronomer and promoter of science. He has constructed an observatory with a 60-cm telescope in a cultural center south of the city of Marrakech. || 
|}

242601–242700 

|-id=648
| 242648 Fribourg ||  || The Swiss canton and city of Fribourg, a young, dynamic and bilingual region near the country's  capital, Bern || 
|}

242701–242800 

|-bgcolor=#f2f2f2
| colspan=4 align=center | 
|}

242801–242900 

|-id=830
| 242830 Richardwessling ||  || Richard J. Wessling (born 1935) worked at U.S. Precision Lens for 35 years, making telescope mirrors from the early 1960s onwards and opening the Pines Optical Shop in 1991. || 
|}

242901–243000 

|-id=000
| 243000 Katysirles ||  || Katherine Ann Sirles (1980–2016) was a sociologist and beloved teacher who studied the sociology of drugs, deviant behavior and gender. || 
|}

References 

242001-243000